Thomas John Bowe (born 22 February 1984) is an Irish former rugby union player from County Monaghan, Ireland. He played on the wing for  Ulster, Ireland and the British & Irish Lions. In March 2012, after four years with Ospreys in Swansea, Wales, he returned to Ulster for the 2012/13 season.

After his playing career, Bowe has taken up television presenting, and is a host of morning television show Ireland AM.

Career

Early career
A former pupil of The Royal School, Armagh, Bowe was a schoolboy provincial full-back, only converting to wing whilst playing for Ireland U-21s. Bowe also ran for the Glaslough Harriers and represented his local parish Donagh in the All-Ireland Community Games. 

Bowe played Gaelic football from U10 level with Emyvale, his local GAA club, and later represented Monaghan at U16 and Minor level. He also played rugby with Monaghan RFC at underage levels as well as representing his primary school team. 

He attended the University of Ulster, Jordanstown and played for the Queen's University Belfast rugby team, earning a selection to the Ireland U20 Team before transferring to Belfast Harlequins. He was subsequently capped at U21 level and was named the Irish Rugby Union Players Association (IRUPA) Young Player of the Year in 2003.

Professional career

Bowe received a call-up to the Ulster squad at the end of the 2003–04 season, scoring on his debut against Connacht and soon made his name as an Ulster regular. He was named IRUPA Young Player of the Year in May 2004. He won the Guinness Ulster Rugby Personality of the Year Award at the Ulster Rugby Awards Dinner in May 2005. In 2006 Bowe won his 1st Celtic League title for Ulster

On 25 January 2008 he confirmed that he would leave Ulster at the end of the 2008 Celtic League season, to join the Ospreys on a two-year deal. In his first season with the Welsh club, he scored a club-record four European Cup tries in a match against Treviso, as well as becoming the leading Magners League try-scorer, having scored the most tries in the league's history. In 2008, he won both the Ulster and Ireland Player of the Year awards. In December 2009 it was announced that Bowe had signed a 3-year extension with the Ospreys.

He returned to Ulster at the start of the 2012/13 season on a 3-year deal. He scored 2 tries on his return for Ulster against Cardiff Blues and was instrumental in the province's league season, helping them to the Pro12 Final.

International career

Bowe made his senior international debut against the USA during the 2004 Autumn Internationals becoming the first player from County Monaghan to win an Ireland cap since the 1920s, marking his introduction to test rugby with a second half try. Bowe won further caps during Ireland's tour to Japan and their Autumn Internationals in 2005.

With that experience and an impressive run of form for Ulster in the Celtic League, he made the 22-man panel for Ireland's 2006 Six Nations opener against Italy, and went on to score a try in that game. After Ireland's poor first half against France in the following Championship match, Bowe was axed from the squad – prompting allegations of him being made a scapegoat by Ireland boss Eddie O'Sullivan.

An injury-plagued latter part of 2006 precipitated a downturn in form, though a rejuvenated Bowe came back with 5 tries in 6 matches to earn his place in Ireland's 2007 Six Nations squad. He failed to make the Irish squad for the disappointing 2007 Rugby World Cup. Bowe earned himself a place in Ireland's original 2008 Six Nations squad after a very good season with Ulster.

He was overlooked for the Ireland match day squad to play Italy in the tournament's opening game, however, despite his form. He was again excluded from the squad the following week when Ireland were narrowly defeated by France in Paris, however on 19 February 2008 Bowe was named in the starting team at for the visit of Scotland to Croke Park, a match in which he scored two tries. He then played in the losses to Wales and England. On 4 February Bowe came on for Keith Earls as a replacement in the 2017 Six Nations Championship against Scotland.

With his good form for the Ospreys continuing in 2008 Bowe retained his right-wing position for Ireland during the Autumn internationals, scoring the team's only try against Argentina. Bowe was then selected on the wing for the 2009 Six Nations opener against France in Dublin. Bowe impressed as Ireland claimed their first win over France in six years with 30–21 triumph. Their next game was against Italy.  Bowe scored a try as Ireland won 38–9. 

After wins against England and Scotland, Ireland took on Wales with a Grand Slam at stake. Bowe scored a try and Ireland won their first Grand Slam for 61 years.

In February 2010 against England in the 2010 Six Nations Championship, he scored two tries including the clinching try with five minutes remaining in a 20–16 win at Twickenham. In March 2010, Bowe was voted 2010 Six Nations Player of the Championship, gaining over 50% of the vote.

Bowe continued to represent Ireland throughout 2010. He was selected in Ireland's squad for the 2011 Six Nations Championship, and scored the opening try of Ireland's demolition of a Grand-Slam chasing England on 19 March. He went to the 2011 Rugby World Cup, his first such tournament, and scored a try against the US in Ireland's opening Pool C game. He was selected in the squad for the 2012 Six Nations Championship, during which he scored 5 tries in Ireland's first three games, including two each against Italy and France.

British & Irish Lions
On 21 April 2009, Bowe was named as a member of the British & Irish Lions for the 2009 tour to South Africa. He started in the first match on the tour, versus a Royal XV and, in this game, became the first try scorer of the 2009 tour. He then scored two tries against the Golden Lions which contributed to his selection for the test side. He wasn't included for the next two games before coming back for the match against Western Province where he scored his fourth try of the tour and set up another for Ugo Monye.

His form on the Tour was outstanding, winning him praise from the sporting media. On 18 June 2009, Ian McGeechan named Bowe in his test side to face South Africa in Durban on 20 June where The Lions lost 26–21 . Bowe, although holding his own in defence, wasn't given any opportunities to run. He was again selected on the wing for the second test. The Lions lost 28–25 due to a last minute penalty by Morné Steyn to clinch the series for the Springboks. Bowe in this game had more opportunities to run and was dangerous in attack. Due to injuries to Brian O'Driscoll and Jamie Roberts, Bowe was selected at outside centre in a partnership with Riki Flutey. He came second behind Jamie Roberts for the Player of the Series award.

In April 2013 he was selected as a member of the 2013 British & Irish Lions squad to tour Australia. While playing against the Queensland Reds, Bowe broke a bone in his hand, which threatened to end his Lions tour. He managed to recover from the injury in time to be included the starting fifteen in the last two tests against Australia, taking the place from Alex Cuthbert who had replaced him whilst he was injured, but was unable to score any points in the test series.

International tries

Honours

Individual
IRUPA Young Player of the Year 2004
Guinness Ulster Rugby Personality of the Year Award 2005
Celtic League Team of the Year (3): 2007-08, 2008-09, 2009-10
IRUPA Players' Player of the Year (2): 2008, 2010
WRPA Players' Player of the Year Award (1): 2010
Celtic League Player of the Year (1): 2009-10 Celtic League
RBS Player of the Championship for the 2010 RBS 6 Nations
Guinness Rugby Writers of Ireland Player of the Year 2010

Ulster
Celtic League (1): 2005-06

Ospreys
Celtic League (2): 2009-10, 2011-12

Ireland
Six Nations (2): 2009, 2015

British & Irish Lions
British & Irish Lions tours:
Tourist (2): 2009, 2013
Series Winner (1): 2013

Non-rugby ventures
Bowe was guest chef in episode two of series seven of The Restaurant in 2010. Bowe appeared on RTÉ's The Late Late Show on 21 May 2010 where he was quizzed on his version of the song "The Black Velvet Band" which he sang during Ireland's Grand Slam celebrations. Bowe was the focus of an RTÉ documentary Tommy Bowe's Bodycheck, which examined what it takes to be a top professional rugby player.

In 2014, Bowe added a clothing line XV kings to his earlier launched footwear brand Lloyd & Pryce. He lent his name to the Tommy Bowe Challenge which was completed in both 2011 and 2012 to raise money for the Glaslough Harriers.

In 2017, Bowe dipped his toe into television presenting becoming a co-presenter on BBC and RTE holiday program, Getaways.  Then in 2018, Bowe was named as the presenter of Eir Sport's coverage of the Pro14 which started in August 2018.

Since August 2020 Bowe has been a host on Ireland AM, the morning television show of Virgin Media Television in Ireland.

Personal life
His father, Paul, won a Leinster Schools' Cup medal with Newbridge College on the 1970 team, captained by Mick Quinn and went on to win a cap for Leinster Schools. Ann, his mother, is a physiotherapist in County Monaghan who runs her own practice. Bowe's sister, Hannah, is an Ireland hockey international, and his younger brother, David, is a rugby union footballer. The Bowe siblings' grandfather was awarded the Military Cross for war service with the British Army at the D-Day Normandy Landings in World War II.

Bowe married his fiancée, former Miss Wales Lucy Whitehouse, on 14 June 2015 at the Corran Resort and Spa in Carmarthenshire, Wales. They have two children together.

References

External links

Lions Profile

1984 births
Living people
Belfast Harlequins rugby union players
British & Irish Lions rugby union players from Ireland
Gaelic footballers who switched code
Monaghan Gaelic footballers
Irish rugby union players
Ireland international rugby union players
People educated at The Royal School, Armagh
Queen's University RFC players
Rugby union wings
Ulster Rugby players
Ospreys (rugby union) players
Rugby union players from County Monaghan
Ireland Wolfhounds international rugby union players
Virgin Media Television (Ireland) presenters
Alumni of University of London Worldwide
Alumni of the University of London